The player efficiency rating (PER) is John Hollinger's all-in-one basketball rating, which attempts to collect or  boil down all of a player's contributions into one number. Using a detailed formula, Hollinger developed a system that rates every player's statistical performance.

Introduction
PER strives to measure a player's per-minute performance, while adjusting for pace.  A league-average PER is always 15.00, which permits comparisons of player performance across seasons.

PER takes into account positive results, including field goals, free throws, 3-pointers, assists, rebounds, blocks and steals and negative results, including missed shots, turnovers and personal fouls. The formula adds positive stats and subtracts negative ones through a statistical point value system. The rating for each player is then adjusted to a per-minute basis so that, for example, substitutes can be compared with starters in playing time debates. It is also adjusted for the team's pace. In the end, one number sums up the players' statistical accomplishments for that season.

Relationship to baseball sabermetrics 
Hollinger's work has benefitted from the observations of sabermetric baseball analysts, such as Bill James.  One of the primary observations is that traditional counting statistics in baseball, like runs batted in and wins, are not reliable indicators of a player's value.  For example, runs batted in is highly dependent upon opportunities created by a player's teammates.  PER extends this critique of counting statistics to basketball, noting that a player's opportunities to accumulate statistics are dependent upon the number of minutes played as well as the pace of the game.

Problems with PER 
PER largely measures offensive performance. Hollinger freely admits that two of the defensive statistics it incorporates—blocks and steals (which was not tracked as an official stat until 1973)—can produce a distorted picture of a player's value and that PER is not a reliable measure of a player's defensive acumen. For example, Bruce Bowen, widely regarded as one of the best defenders in the NBA through the 2006–07 season, routinely posted single-digit PERs.

Bear in mind that this rating is not the final, once-and-for-all answer for a player's accomplishments during the season. This is especially true for players such as Bruce Bowen and Trenton Hassell who are defensive specialists but don't get many blocks or steals.

Some have argued that PER gives undue weight to a player's contribution in limited minutes, or against a team's second unit, and it undervalues players who have enough diversity in their game to play starter's minutes.

PER has been said to reward inefficient shooting. To quote Dave Berri, the author of The Wages of Wins:

Hollinger argues that each two point field goal made is worth about 1.65 points. A three point field goal made is worth 2.65 points. A missed field goal, though, costs a team 0.72 points. Given these values, with a bit of math we can show that a player will break even on his two point field goal attempts if he hits on 30.4% of these shots. On three pointers the break-even point is 21.4%. If a player exceeds these thresholds, and virtually every NBA player does so with respect to two-point shots, the more he shoots the higher his value in PERs. So a player can be an inefficient scorer and simply inflate his value by taking a large number of shots.

Hollinger responded via a post on ESPN's TrueHoop blog:

Berri leads off with a huge misunderstanding of PER—that the credits and debits it gives for making and missing shots equate to a “break-even” shooting mark of 30.4% on 2-point shots. He made this assumption because he forgot that PER is calibrated against the rest of the league at the end of the formula.

Actually, if we took a player that was completely average in every other respect for the 2006–07 season—rebounds, free throws, assists, turnovers, etc.—and gave him a league-average rate of shots, and all of them were 2-pointers, and he shot 30.4%, he'd end up with a PER of 7.18. As long-time PER fans know, that would make him considerably worse than nearly every player in the league.

To end up with a league-average PER of 15.00, the actual break-even mark in this case is 48.5%, which is exactly what the league average is on 2-point shots this season.

Reference guide 
Hollinger has set up PER so that the league average, every season, is 15.00, which produces sort of a handy reference guide:

Only 30 times has a player posted a season efficiency rating over 30.0 (with more than 15 games played in that season), with the highest score being 32.85 (Nikola Jokić). Michael Jordan and LeBron James lead with four 30+ seasons, with Shaquille O'Neal, Wilt Chamberlain and Giannis Antetokounmpo having accomplished three each, Anthony Davis, Nikola Jokić and Joel Embiid having accomplished two each, and David Robinson, Tracy McGrady, Dwyane Wade, Chris Paul, Stephen Curry, Russell Westbrook and James Harden having accomplished one each.

Career PER leaders (minimum 15000 MP) 

As of January 26, 2023.

Active players are listed in bold.
* Indicates member of the Hall of Fame.

PER since 1951–52

Career PER – Michael Jordan vs. LeBron James
Prior to the 2013–14 season, LeBron James was on the verge of surpassing Michael Jordan's career PER to take the number one spot. As the metric is averaged over the length of a player's entire career a decrease in efficiency later in his career means a player can move down in the ranking; Jordan's PER took a big hit in the final two years of his career when he returned to the game with the Washington Wizards, posting 20.7 in his penultimate season and 19.3 in his final season, compared to his career high of 31.7 (Jordan's PER was 29.1 without accounting for his Wizards years). The debate was intensified on 1 October 2013, with Jordan stating that he would have liked to have played against LeBron, and believes he would have won a one-on-one encounter. Several news features focus on comparing the two players by using the PER metric.

At the conclusion of the 2012–13 NBA season Miami Heat head coach, Erik Spoelstra, stated that comparing players from different generations is the equivalent to comparing apples and oranges. explaining: You'll never be able to tell [how James stacks up to Jordan or Magic Johnson] because they didn't play against each other. The game is different now than when it was played in the 1980s or even before that".

Players from different NBA generations and Career PER
Comparing players from different generations using PER presents several problems, this is primarily due to the rule changes and the changes in statistical data collected from different eras (although many other factors could be taken into consideration, even down to the increased sample size as the NBA grew through incorporating more teams). Some of the more important rule changes that should be considered include; some of the players on this list, such as Wilt Chamberlain and Bill Russell, played before the three-point shot, blocks, and steals stats were officially recorded. Blocked shots and steals were first officially recorded in the NBA during the 1973–74 season. The three-point shot entered the league in 1979–80 season. During the 1990s and 2000s numerous rule changes were incorporated, the "three point foul" and "clear path" rules were both introduced in the 1995–96 season with the effect of increasing the number of free throws, hand-checking (the amount of contact a defender may make with an opposing player) was banned in 1994 and the use of elbows was banned in 1997 (both rules had seen various degrees of limitation by earlier rule changes) although neither was fully implemented until 2004. The 2004 rule changes, which also included calling the defensive 3 second rule ("[...] a defensive player may not station himself in the key area longer than three seconds"—a longstanding rule which had been ignored by referees) had a major effect, opening up the game and allowing a more free-flowing offense; it encouraged aggressive inside attack based plays (to draw fouls), and has increased the number of fouls given when contact is made on players who drive to the basket.

Former ABA and NBA Coach Larry Brown is quoted as saying: "The college game is much more physical (than the NBA) [...] I always tease Michael (Jordan), if he played today, he'd average 50."

Calculation
All calculations begin with what is called unadjusted PER (uPER). The formula is:

When multiplied out and refactored, the equation above becomes:

Where
,
,
.
With
tm, the prefix, indicating of team rather than of player;
lg, the prefix, indicating of league rather than of player;
min for number of minutes played;
3P for number of three-point field goals made;
FG for number of field goals made;
FT for number of free throws made;
VOP for value of possession (but in reference to the league, in this instance);
RB for number of rebounds: ORB for offensive, DRB for defensive, TRB for (total) combined, RBP for percentage of offensive or defensive;
others being outlined in basketball statistics.

Once uPER is calculated, it must be adjusted for team pace and normalized to the league to become PER:

This final step takes away the advantage held by players whose teams play a fastbreak style (and therefore have more possessions and more opportunities to do things on offense), and then sets the league average to 15.00.

Also note that it is impossible to calculate PER (at least in the conventional manner described above) for NBA seasons prior to 1978, as the league did not keep track of turnovers among other advanced statistics before that year.

References

External links 
 CREZ Basketball Systems Inc.,  Software to score your own basketball games and view PER player and lineup statistics
 An in-depth description of how to calculate PER
 Hollinger's articles at SI
 Basketball-Reference.com, Historical NBA statistical site (includes PER)
 KnickerBlogger.net
 ESPN.com Insider (subscription service)

Basketball statistics